Dour is a Bangladeshi drama streaming television series created by Raihan Khan. Starring Mosharraf Karim as a businessman in Dhaka. The series consisting of nine episodes premiered on 2 May 2022 on Hoichoi. The web series made the record of the highest number of streaming on first week on the Hoichoi platform. On her Facebook account, Suborna Mustafa praised the series.

Premise
The events of the web series are about a car. Prominent businessman Ruhul Amin's car was stolen. Ruhul Amin reported the matter to the police. But he did not realize that he had some confidential documents in the car that could be dangerous if they fell into the hands of the police. In the meantime, he learns from his wife that their child is missing. It is known that their child got into the trunk of the car. Now Ruhul Amin has to find the car.

Cast
 Mosharraf Karim as Ruhul Amin
 Intekhab Dinar
 Tariq Anam Khan
 Robena Reza Jui as wife of Ruhul Amin
 Irfan Sajjad as car thief
 Tasnuva Tisha as car thief
 Ujjal Mahmud as car thief

Episodes

Series 1 (2022)

Production
The shooting of the web series started in January 2022. Two days later the shooting was over. Although Rafiath Rashid Mithila was supposed to act in this series, the shooting started without her.

Release
In April 2022, the official trailer for the series was released on Hoichoi's YouTube channel.

References

External links
 Dour on Hoichoi
 

Bengali-language web series
Bangladeshi web series
2022 Bangladeshi television series debuts
2020s Bangladeshi drama television series
Hoichoi original programming